Paul Jenkins  is an American academic. He is Professor of Poetry at Hampshire College.

Jenkins received an M.A. and a Ph.D. degree from the University of Washington, Seattle. Before moving to Hampshire, Jenkins taught at Elms College and the University of Massachusetts Amherst.

Bibliography
Forget the Sky. Fort Collins, Colorado: L'Epervier Press, 1979.
The Conservative Rebel: A Social History of Greenfield, Massachusetts. Greenfield, MA: Town of Greenfield, Massachusetts, 1982.
 Radio Tooth. New York: Four Way, 1997. 
 Six Small Fires. New York: Four Way, 2002.

References

Living people
American male poets
Hampshire College faculty
University of Washington alumni
Year of birth missing (living people)
Elms College faculty
University of Massachusetts Amherst faculty
20th-century American poets
20th-century American male writers
21st-century American poets
21st-century American male writers